Seha Meray (1921–1978) was a Turkish academic.

He was born in İstanbul. After graduating from Galatasaray High School in 1940, he studied in the Faculty of Political Sciences  of Ankara University. In 1944 he graduated from the faculty and became an academic in the same faculty. In 1948 he became the associate professor and in 1954 professor of International law.
Between 23.02.1961 and 5.08.1961 he was elected as the rector of Middle East Technical University. He went to Canada and lectured on Space Law in McGill University as a visiting professor. 
He took part in the National committee of UNESCO and Turkish Language Association.

He died in 1978 in Ankara.

Books
In addition to textbooks, his books are the following 
Toplum Bilim Üzerine ("On the Society and Science")
İnsanca Yaşamak ("Living Humanly")
Su Başlarını Devler Tutmuş ("Critical Posts were  occupied by the Giants")
Lozan Barış Konferansı Belgeleri ("Documents of Conference of Lausanne", 6 volumes)

References

1921 births
1978 deaths
Academics from Istanbul
Galatasaray High School alumni
Ankara University Faculty of Political Sciences alumni
Academic staff of Ankara University
Academic staff of McGill University
Rectors of Middle East Technical University
Turkish expatriates in Canada